The following is a list of notable deaths in June 2001.

Entries for each day are listed alphabetically by surname. A typical entry lists information in the following sequence:
 Name, age, country of citizenship at birth, subsequent country of citizenship (if applicable), reason for notability, cause of death (if known), and reference.

June 2001

1
Peter Corr, 77, Irish footballer.
Jamake Highwater, 70, American writer and journalist.
Nkosi Johnson, 12, South African AIDS awareness campaigner, AIDS.
Tom Keane, 74, American gridiron football player.
Hank Ketcham, 81, American cartoonist (Dennis the Menace), prostate cancer.
Abe Silverstein, 92, American aerospace engineer.

Victims of the Nepalese royal massacre
King Birendra, 55, King of Nepal
Queen Aishwarya, 51, Queen of Nepal
Prince Nirajan, 22, son of Birendra and Aishwarya
Princess Shruti, 24, daughter of Birendra and Aishwarya
Prince Dhirendra, 51, brother of King Birendra
Princess Shanti, 60, sister of King Birendra
Princess Sharada, 59, sister of King Birendra
Princess Jayanti, 54, cousin of King Birendra

2
Imogene Coca, 92, American actress (Your Show of Shows).
John T. Fesperman, 76, American conductor, organist and author (Division of Musical Instruments at the National Museum of History and Technology).
Sir Kenneth Hayr, 66, British air marshal.
Joey Maxim, 79, American professional boxer (World Light Heavyweight Champion).
Zygmunt Milczewski, 95, Polish historian and resistance fighter during  World War II.
Abdul Aziz Pasha, Bangladesh army officer.
Viktor Popkov, 54, Russian dissident, human rights activist and journalist, shot.
Frank Stagg, 89, American Southern Baptist theologian and author.
Adolf Thiel, 86, Austrian-German rocket scientist.
Gene Woodling, 78, American baseball player.

3
Humayun Abdulali, 87, Indian ornithologist and biologist.
J. C. Furnas, 95, American writer and social historian.
Jamake Highwater, 70, American writer.
Bahgat Osman, 69, Egyptian cartoonist and illustrator.
Andrea Prader, 81, Swiss scientist, physician, and pediatric endocrinologist.
Anthony Quinn, 86, Mexican-American actor (The Guns of Navarone, Zorba the Greek, Lawrence of Arabia) (two-time winner of Academy Award for Best Supporting Actor).
Niño Valdés, 76, Cuban heavyweight boxing champion.

4
John Corriden, 83, American baseball player.
Dipendra, King of Nepal, 29, suicide.
John Hartford, 63, American musician and composer ("Gentle on My Mind").
Chenjerai Hunzvi, 51, Zimbabwean politician.
Dinos Iliopoulos, 85, Greek actor.
Pierre Lamaison, 52, French anthropologist.
Lu Jiaxi, 85, Chinese physical chemist.
Reynaldo Mendoza, 84, Philippine Army brigadier general.
Darshan Ranganathan, 60, Indian organic chemist.
Ruth Sanger, 82, Australian immunogeneticist, haematologist and serologist.
Tod Sweeney, 82, British Army officer.
Joan Vohs, 73, American model and actress (Fort Ti, Fireside Theater, Maverick, Perry Mason, Family Affair).
Francois Weideman, 40, South African cricket player, murdered.

5
Pedro Laín Entralgo, 93, Spanish medical historian.
Louise Arnstein Freedman, 85/86, American visual artist.
Dennis Gillespie, 65, Scottish footballer.
Aaron Green, 84, American architect
Howard Earl Johnston, 72, Canadian member of Parliament (House of Commons representing Okanagan—Kootenay and Okanagan—Revelstoke, British Columbia).
L. Fletcher Prouty, 84, American Chief of Special Operations for the Joint Chiefs of Staff.

6
Alfonso Brescia, 71, Italian film director.
José Manuel Castañón, 81, Spanish writer.
William J. Darby, 87, American nutrition scientist.
Luce d'Eramo, 75, Italian writer and literary critic.
Ford Garrison, 85, American baseball player.
Ken Lack, Jamaican ska, rocksteady and reggae record producer.
Douglas Lilburn, 85, New Zealand composer.
Ami Priyono, 61, Indonesian film director and actor.
Suzanne Schiffman, 71, French film director and screenwriter, cancer.
Lyubov Sokolova, 79, Soviet/Russian film actress.
John C. F. Tillson, 86, United States Army Major General.

7
Franco Balducci, 78, Italian film actor.
Víctor Paz Estenssoro, 93, Bolivian politician and four-term President of Bolivia.
Carole Fredericks, 49, American singer, heart attack.
Ken Green, 77, English footballer.
Boris Lavrenko, 81, Russian painter.
Betty Neels, 91, British novelist.
Charles Templeton, 85, Canadian cartoonist, broadcaster and writer.
Leonard Tepper, 61, American actor and comedian.

8
Aviva Gileadi, 83, Israeli nuclear scientist.
Duncan MacIntyre, 85, New Zealand politician.
Kotayya Pratyagatma, 75, Indian film journalist, director and producer.
Alex de Renzy, 65, American director and producer of pornographic movies.
Nathaniel Rochester, 82, American computer scientist.
Dennis Puleston, 95,  British-American environmentalist, adventurer and designer.
Don Roper, 78, English footballer.
Lanette Scheeline, 90, American artist and designer.
Harry Watson, 79, American child actor and television journalism pioneer.

9
Ronnie Allen, 72, English football player and manager.
Malcolm Cooper, 53, British sport shooter, cancer.
Carol Bernstein Ferry, 76, American social change philanthropist.
Richard T. Hanna, 87, American politician (U.S. Representative for California's 34th congressional district), (Koreagate).
Harold A. Jerry Jr., 81, American lawyer and politician, known for environmental preservation of the Adirondacks.
Yaltah Menuhin, 79, American-British pianist, artist and poet.
Deirdre O'Connell, 61, Irish American actress, singer, and theatre director, cancer.
Branko Pleša, 75, Serbian actor and theatre director.

10
Jochen Liedtke, 48, German computer scientist.
John McKay, 77, American football assistant coach (Oregon Ducks) and head coach (USC Trojans, Tampa Bay Buccaneers).
Mike Mentzer, 49, American bodybuilder.
Vladimir Muravyov, 62, Russian translator and literary critic.
Princess Leila Pahlavi of Iran, 31, Iranian Princess and daughter of the Shah of Iran.

11
Pierre Eyt, 67, French  Cardinal of the Roman Catholic Church.
Lou Fant, 69, American teacher, author, expert on American Sign Language, and actor (Ace Hardware's "helpful hardware man").
Lou Lombardo, 72, American baseball player.
Timothy McVeigh, 33, American convicted terrorist (Oklahoma City bombing), execution by lethal injection.
Amalia Mendoza, 77, Mexican singer ("Échame a mi la culpa", "Amarga navidad").
Milan Pantić, 46, Serbian journalist, assassinated.

12
Owen Bush, 79, American television announcer and actor.
Peggy Cartwright, 88, Canadian silent film actress.
W. D. Davies, 89/90, Welsh congregationalist minister and theologian.
Viktor Hamburger, 100, German embryologist.
Jim Seminoff, 78, American basketball player.
Paula Wiesinger, 94, Italian alpine skier and mountain climber.
Thomas Wilson, 73, Scottish composer.

13
Gordon Christie, 86, New Zealand politician.
Marcelo Fromer, 39, Brazilian rock musician, traffic accident.
Robert Heyssel, 72, American health-service executive (President of Johns Hopkins Hospital from 1982 to 1992).
Digish Mehta, 66, Indian essayist, novelist and critic.
Rajzel Żychlińsky, 90, Polish poet.

14
Paul Carey, 38, American civil servant, endocrine cancer.
Oleg Fedoseyev, 65, Soviet Olympic long jump and triple jump athlete (silver medal winner in men's triple jump at the 1964 Summer Olympics).
Miroslav Marcovich, 82, Serbian-American philologist.
Jay D. Scott, 48, American convicted murderer, execution by lethal injection.
Horace M. Wade, 85, general in the US Air Force.

15
Henri Alekan, 92, French cinematographer, leukemia.
Maria Foka, 83, Greek actress.
Mikhail Gluzsky, 82, Soviet/Russian actor.
John Harper, 71, American politician, member of the Kentucky House of Representatives.
Jay Moriarity, 22, American surfer, drowned.
Marcelino Solis, 70, Mexican baseball player.

16
Dorothy Still Danner, 86, American Navy nurse and  prisoner of war during World War II.
Joe Darion, 84, American musical theatre lyricist (two-time Tony Award winner for Man of La Mancha: Tony Award for Best Musical, Tony Award for Best Original Score).
Alessandro Faedo, 87, Italian mathematician and politician.
Wally Hood, 75, American baseball player.
Sam Jethroe, 84, American baseball player, heart attack.
Ragheb Moftah, 102, Egyptian Coptic musicologist.
Duchess Altburg of Oldenburg, 98, German noblewoman.
Jay Rabinowitz, 74, American lawyer and jurist, complications of leukemia.
Sava Vuković, 71, Serbian Orthodox bishop.
Arthur Wheeler (motorcyclist), 85, British motorcyclist

17
Diana Bellamy, 57, American character actress (Air Force One, Outrageous Fortune, Popular).
John Broderick, 58, American film director, producer and screenwriter.
Donald J. Cram, 82, American chemist and co-winner of Nobel Prize in Chemistry in 1987.
Ninfa Laurenzo, 77, Houston restaurateur, bone cancer.
Thomas Winning, 76, Scottish Roman Catholic cardinal, heart attack.
Mohammad Yunus, 84, Indian diplomat.

18
Dame Rosamund Holland-Martin, 86, British head of the NSPCC.
Barton Mumaw, 88, American dancer and choreographer.
Ivan Neill, 88, British Anglican priest and Army officer.
Davorin Popović, 54, Bosnian singer-songwriter.
Paolo Emilio Taviani, 88, Italian politician, economist and historian.
Karl Friedrich Titho, 90, German nazi criminal.

19
Frank Bossard, 88, British Secret Intelligence Service agent.
Lindsay L. Cooper, 61, Scottish musician.
Jerry Cornes, 91, British athlete.
Juan Garza, 44, American murderer and drug trafficker, execution by lethal injection.
John Heyer, 84, Australian documentary filmmaker (The Back of Beyond).
Jandhyala, 50, Indian screenwriter, director and actor, heart attack.
Robert Klippel, 81, Australian sculptor.
Col Maxwell, 83, Australian rugby league player.
Lee Mishkin, 74, American animator and director, heart failure.
Stanley Mosk, 88, American jurist, politician, and attorney.
Brian O'Shaughnessy, 70, British-South African film actor.
C. R. Pattabhiraman, 94, Indian lawyer and politician.
David Sylvester, 76, British art critic.
Eddie Vartan, 63, French musician, bandleader, arranger, and record producer, cerebral hemorrhage.
Guma Zorrilla, 81, Uruguayan costume designer.

20
Angela Browne, 63, British actress (Ghost Squad, The Avengers, The Prisoner, Upstairs, Downstairs, The Adventures of Sherlock Holmes).
Tom Burns, 88, English sociologist and author.
Bob Keegan, 80, American baseball player.
Bert Kramer, 66, American actor (Kojak, The Bionic Woman, The Rockford Files, Dallas, Dynasty, Matlock).
James Parker, 77, American art historian.
Massimo Pirri, 55, Italian film director and screenwriter.
Delbert Leroy True, 77, American architect.
Douglas Scott, 20, High-school student murdered by Demetreus Nix.

21
John Lee Hooker, 83, American blues singer, songwriter and guitarist ("Boogie Chillen'", "Crawling King Snake", "Dimples").
Soad Hosny, 58, Egyptian actress ("Cinderella of Egyptian cinema").
François Lesure, 78, French librarian and  musicologist.
K. V. Mahadevan, 83, Indian  singer-songwriter, music producer, and musician.
Carroll O'Connor, 76, American actor (All in the Family, In the Heat of the Night, Cleopatra).
Vernon Sewell, 97, British film director.

22
Arbi Barayev, 27, Chechen warlord, killed during a raid by the Russian military special forces.
Luis Carniglia, 83, Argentine footballer and manager.
George Evans, 81, American comic book and comic strip cartoonist and illustrator.
John Herbert, 74, Canadian playwright (Fortune and Men's Eyes).
Lika Yanko, 73, Bulgarian artist.

23
Odd Abrahamsen, 77, Norwegian poet.
Corinne Calvet, 76, French actress (What Price Glory?, Sailor Beware, So This Is Paris, On the Riviera).
Panteley Dimitrov, 60, Bulgarian footballer.
Yvonne Dionne, 67, Canadian quintuplet (first known quintuplets to have survived their infancy).

24
Muhammad Bashir, 66, Pakistani wrestler.
Sergey Cherny, 24, Russian serial killer, pneumonia.
Onni Hynninen, 90, Finnish Olympic shooter (men's shooting 50 metre rifle prone at the 1948 Summer Olympics).
Robinson McIlvaine, 87, US diplomat.
Avadhanam Sita Raman, 82, Indian writer and journalist.
Nicola Ann Raphael, 15, Scottish schoolgirl, suicide.
Milton Santos, 75, Brazilian geographer.
William H. Sewell, 91, American sociologist.

25
Ken La Grange, 78, South African Olympic boxer (middleweight boxing at the 1948 Summer Olympics).
Gabriel Hernández, 27, Dominican Olympic boxer (light heavyweight boxing at the 1996 Summer Olympics).
Kurt Hoffmann, 90, German film director and son of Carl Hoffmann.
Frederick C. Langone, American politician.
John LeRoy, 26, American baseball player.
Paxton Mills, 52, American radio broadcaster and announcer, heart disease.
George Senesky, 79, American professional basketball player and coach, cancer.
Charles S. Whitehouse, 79, American career diplomat, cancer.

26
Patricia Angadi, 86, British portrait painter and novelist, killed himself in 1981.
William Bryant, 77, American character actor (Escape from San Quentin, Experiment in Terror, How to Murder Your Wife, The Great Race).
Gina Cigna, 101, French-Italian dramatic soprano.
Ray Devey, 83, English footballer.
Margaret Kilgallen, 33, American visual artist, complications from breast cancer.
Louis Klemantaski, 89, British photographer.
Oluf C. Müller, 80, Norwegian civil servant.
Gopala Ramanujam, 86, Indian politician.
Lalla Romano, 94, Italian novelist, poet, artist and journalist.
Robert Smith, 88, American actor.
Soccer, 13, American dog actor.
John F. Yardley, 76, American  aeronautical engineer, cancer.

27
Sidney Buckwold, 84, Canadian politician and businessman.
Hal Goldman, 81, American screenwriter, three Primetime Emmy Awards: The Jack Benny Program (1959, 1960), An Evening with Carol Channing (1966).
Darrell Huff, 86, American statistician.
Tove Jansson, 86, Finnish author, painter and comic strip artist.
Jack Lemmon, 76, American actor (The Apartment, Some Like It Hot, Save the Tiger), Oscar winner (1956, 1974), bladder and colorectal cancer.
Udo Proksch, 67, Austrian industrialist.
Joan Sims, 71, British actress (Carry On Nurse, Carry On Cleo, Carry On Camping, On the Up, As Time Goes By).
Jukka Wuolio, 74, Finnish ice hockey player.

28
Mortimer J. Adler, 98, American philosopher and author.
Jim Ellis, 45, American computer scientist (Usenet).
David Guthrie Freeman, 80, American badminton player (multi-year U.S. Champion).
Caroline R. Jones, 59, American advertising pioneer.

29
Mary Barnes, 86, English artist and writer.
Maurice Estève, 97, French painter.
Maximos V Hakim, 93, Egyptian patriarch.
Minoru Kawabata, 90, Japanese artist.
Karen Lamm, 49, American film actress and producer, heart failure.
Silvio Oddi, 90, Italian cardinal and Vatican diplomat.

30
Chet Atkins, 77, American country musician (14 Grammy Awards, Rock & Roll Hall of Fame, Country Music Hall of Fame and Museum, Musicians Hall of Fame and Museum).
Joe Fagan, 80, English football manager.
Jack Finlay, 85, New Zealand rugby player.
Joe Henderson, 64, American jazz tenor saxophonist.

References 

2001-06
 06